Laracha Club de Fútbol is a Spanish football team based in A Laracha, in the autonomous community of Galicia. Founded in 1965, it currently plays in preferente Group 1, holding home games at Estadio Municipal de Laracha, with a 1,000-seat capacity.

Season to season

7 seasons in Tercera División

References

External links
Official website 
Futbolme.com profile

Football clubs in Galicia (Spain)
Association football clubs established in 1965
Divisiones Regionales de Fútbol clubs
1965 establishments in Spain
Spanish reserve football teams
Deportivo de La Coruña